Juan Sastoque is a retired American soccer player who spent two seasons in Major League Soccer.

Born in New York, Sastoque grew up in California, graduating from El Cajon Valley High School.  He attended Cal State Northridge for one year, playing on the men’s soccer team in 1995.  In 1996, he turned professional with the DFW Toros of the USISL.  He was selected as the 1996 USISL Rookie of the Year.  In 1997, Sastoque signed a MLS Project 40 contract with Major League Soccer and was assigned to the Dallas Burn. The Burn sent him on loan to the Toros at the beginning of June 1997, to the El Paso Patriots later in June and to the New Orleans Riverboat Gamblers in July.  In 1998, Sastoque spent most of the season on loan with the Project 40 team, in addition to a few games with the Toros.  The Burn waived Sastoque on November 2, 1998.  He then moved to Juan Aurich in the Peruvian Primera División.  In 2000, he played for CD Badajoz of the Spanish Segunda División.  He returned to the United States in the fall of 2000 to sign with the Dallas Sidekicks of the World Indoor Soccer League.  He scored a hat trick in the Sidekicks final game of the regular season, Sastoque’s second game with the team.  He remained in the Dallas area, playing for the amateur West Dallas Knights in 2001 before rejoining the Toros, now known as the Texas Spurs for the 2002 season.  On October 2, 2002, Sastoque rejoined the Sidekicks, now playing in the second Major Indoor Soccer League.  The Sidekicks released him on November 14, 2002.  In 2003, Sastoque played for the Cincinnati Riverhawks of the USL A-League.  He moved back to Texas where he played for Dallas Roma F.C. in both 2005 and 2006.  In the fall of 2006, he began playing for Soccer Studio, an indoor team which competed in the Premier Arena Soccer League.  Currently enjoys playing soccer with his kids, Logan, Sebastian & Ava and is a professional Real Estate Agent with his wife, Bettina, in Allen, TX.  Allen is a suburb of Dallas, TX.

External links
 
 Dallas Sidekicks: Juan Sastoque
 Juan Sastoque:Model
 Juan Sastoque:Realtor

References

Living people
1977 births
Sportspeople from Brooklyn
Soccer players from New York City
American soccer players
American expatriate soccer players
Cincinnati Riverhawks players
FC Dallas players
Dallas Sidekicks (WISL) players
Dallas Sidekicks (2001–2008 MISL) players
DFW Tornados players
El Paso Patriots players
Juan Aurich footballers
New Orleans Riverboat Gamblers players
Major Indoor Soccer League (2001–2008) players
World Indoor Soccer League players
USISL players
Major League Soccer players
Cal State Northridge Matadors men's soccer players
MLS Pro-40 players
A-League (1995–2004) players
Association football forwards